, better known as , was a Kaga samurai of the Bakumatsu who served as a karō to the Maeda clan.

Biography 
The Matsudaira family, as retainers to the Maeda clan, held 4,000 koku within Kaga. He became a karō in 1863, and went to Kyoto in 1864.

The mediation failed, and in the ensuing battle, Yoshiyasu fled Kyoto. Maeda Nariyasu, Yoshiyasu's father, placed Yoshiyasu under house arrest. Daini took responsibility for Yoshiyasu's role in the Kinmon incident, and was forced to perform seppuku with Sagawa Yoshisuke as his kaishakunin. Yoshisuke recounted the circumstances of Daini's seppuku in his diary.

In 1879, buildings owned by the Ishikawa Prefecture Kanazawa Hospital were built on the site where Daini's family once resided.

References 

1823 births
1864 deaths
Forced suicides
Kaga-Maeda retainers
Karō
People of Bakumatsu
Suicides by seppuku
1860s suicides